College football is gridiron football played at colleges and universities within the United States and Canada.

College football may also refer to:
British Universities American Football League, college American football in the United Kingdom
BUSA Football League, college association football in the United Kingdom
NCAA Football Championship (Philippines), college association football in the Philippines
ONEFA, college American football in Mexico

See also
College soccer